1055 (MLV) was a common year starting on Sunday of the Julian calendar.

Events 
By place

 Byzantine Empire 
 January 11 – Emperor Constantine IX (Monomachos) dies after a 12½-year reign at Constantinople. He is succeeded by Theodora (a sister of the former Empress Zoë) who is proclaimed by the imperial guard (with strong opposition from the council) as empress of the Byzantine Empire.

Europe
 King Ferdinand I (the Great) begins his campaign against al-Andalus. He conquers Seia from the Christian allies of the Muslim taifas. In a drive to consolidate his southern border in Portugal – Ferdinand re-populates the city of Zamora with some of his Cantabrian (montañeses) subjects.

 England 
 October 24 – Ælfgar, earl of Mercia, is outlawed by the witan ("meeting of wise men"). In revenge he builds a force, and allies himself with the Welsh king Gruffydd ap Llywelyn. After defeating Ralph the Timid (a nephew of King Edward the Confessor), they attack Hereford and raid the church – taking everything of value, leaving the building on fire. The rebels also attack Leominster.
 Edward the Confessor gives Tostig Godwinson (upon the death of Earl Siward) the important position as earl of Northumbria and the difficult mission of bringing the northern state under control.

 Arabian Empire 
 Winter – The Seljuk Turks led by Sultan Tughril capture Baghdad and enter the city in a Roman-styled triumph. Al-Malik al-Rahim, the last Buyid emir in Iraq, is taken prisoner. 

By topic

Art
 Construction on the Liaodi Pagoda in Hebei is completed (the tallest pagoda in Chinese history, standing at a height of 84 m (275 ft) tall).

Religion
 King Andrew I (the Catholic) establishes the Benedictine Tihany Abbey. Its foundation charter is the earliest written record extant in the Hungarian language.
 April 13 – Pope Victor II succeeds Leo IX as the 153rd pope of the Catholic Church in Rome (until 1057).

Births 
 August 16 – Malik-Shah I, sultan of the Seljuk Empire (d. 1092)
 September 28 – Uicheon, Korean Buddhist monk (d. 1101)
 Adelaide of Weimar-Orlamünde, German noblewoman (d. 1100)
 Alger of Liège, French clergyman and priest (d. 1131)
 Bertha of Holland, French queen consort (d. 1094)
 Fujiwara no Akisue, Japanese nobleman (d. 1123)
 Gilbert Crispin, Norman abbot and theologian (d. 1117)
 Gruffudd ap Cynan, king of Gwynedd (approximate date)
 Hildebert, French hagiographer and theologian (d. 1133)
 Ida of Austria, German duchess and crusader (d. 1101)
 Judith of Lens, niece of William the Conqueror (or 1054)
 Machig Labdrön, Tibetan Buddhist teacher (d. 1149)
 Minamoto no Shunrai, Japanese poet (d. 1129)
 Terken Khatun, Seljuk empress (approximate date)
 Vigrahapala III, ruler of the Pala Empire (d. 1070)

Deaths 
 January 10 – Bretislav I, duke of Bohemia
 January 11 – Constantine IX, Byzantine emperor 
 April 10 – Conrad II, duke of Bavaria (b. 1052)
 May 26 – Adalbert, margrave of Austria
 August 28 – Xing Zong, Chinese emperor (b. 1016)
 November 13 – Welf III, duke of Carinthia
 December 5 – Conrad I, duke of Bavaria 
 A Nong, Chinese shamaness, matriarch and warrior
 Benedict I, Hungarian politician and archbishop
 Boniface IV Frederick, margrave of Tuscany
 Gruffydd ap Rhydderch, king of Deheubarth
 Mauger (or Malger), archbishop of Rouen
 Nong Zhigao, Vietnamese chieftain of Nong
 Rinchen Zangpo, Tibetan Buddhist monk (b. 958)
 Siward (or Sigurd), earl of Northumbria
 Theodore Aaronios, Byzantine governor
 Yan Shu, Chinese statesman and poet (b. 991)

References